The digital divide in Pakistan refers to inequalities between individuals, households, and other groups of different demographic and socioeconomic levels in Pakistan in access to information and communication technologies (ICTs) and in the knowledge and skills needed to effectively use the information gained from connecting.

Internet access 
Pakistan is one of the South Asian countries that does have internet services, with 88% of the population having access to it. Internet access in Pakistan began in the 1990s and has continued to grow over the past decades. In fact, Pakistan has about 61.34 million internet users in January 2021, an increase of 21% from the previous year. However, according to data collected by the World Bank, Pakistan has an overall population of about 221 million people (2020). In addition, Pakistan also has about 15 million people who access the internet from their mobile devices.

Pakistan has 5 broadband internet providers and 10 DSL. Broadband use through computers is the number one way that people access the internet in Pakistan, with more than 100 million people using it. The second most popular way that people of Pakistan access the internet is through their cellular devices. Even though there are about 61.34 million internet users compared to a large population, Internet in Pakistan is ranked 20th in the world.

Cell phone coverage
Currently, Pakistan has four major cell phone providers. They are (in order from most to fewest subscribers): Jazz 69.24 million; Telenor 48.94 million; Zong 40.12 million; and Ufone 23.48 million. Special Communications Organization (SCOM) operates mainly in the regions of Azad Kashmir and Gilgit-Baltistan, and has 1.42 million subscribers. This adds up to a total of 183.20 million subscribers across the country. According to the Pakistan Telecommunication Authority, the overall teledensity was 85% in 2021. Recently in May 2017, the Pakistani government decided to lower tariffs and taxes on cellular services as well as on mobile phones. The reasons for this decision included years of pressure from the nation's top mobile operators and a World Bank report pointing out Pakistan's high taxing of telecom services in the region.

Gender and caste
In rural Pakistan, cell service use is divided along gender lines. Karin Astrid Siegmann pointed out this disparity; 40 percent of female users have to ask permission from the male owners to make calls. Cell phones being in the hands of females is viewed unfavorably in Pakistani culture. According to one participant in the study, from the Muzzafargarh district in rural Pakistan, "Women don't even know how to dial a number." Additionally, the percentage of women owning a cell phone is 36% compared to men at 78% overall.

Besides gender, there is a distinct divide among castes. Newer castes rank much more highly on the Digital Access Index (DAI) than do the older castes. The same study compared two political parties. One political party, called the PTI (Pakistan Tehreek-e-Insaf), was composed of newer castes (Khan, Hashmi, Alvi, and Qureshi). The Muslim League is composed of older castes. The PTI outperformed the Pakistan Muslim League in number of foreign visitors to its web site, with a combined percentage of 12.7%, and in websites linking to it with 450, compared to the Muslim League's 168 (See Table 6 page 354). Ahsan Abdullah elaborates the important background of these findings: "Members of the new caste traditionally have not been farmers; for example, members of the Sheikh caste are traditionally traders, and members of the Syed caste traditionally hold religious offices, and hence they have to be better educated as compared to the old caste members. The old caste members, who are traditionally farmers, require tacit knowledge more than education to be successful. This observation is supported by the higher literacy rate in new castes as compared to the old caste members, with Pathan, Sheikh, and Syed being the top three educated castes among the 12 castes considered."

Solutions
Besides Private efforts, Public efforts put forth by the Pakistani government would help bridge the digital divide. There is an ambitious undertaking called the Universal Services Fund which would aim to provide broadband coverage to the whole nation by 2018.

References

Pakistan
Pakistan